The 1909 Clemson Tigers football team represented Clemson Agricultural College—now known as Clemson University—as a member of the Southern Intercollegiate Athletic Association (SIAA) during the 1909 college football season. Under Bob Williams, who returned for his second season as head coach after having helped the team in 1906, the Tigers compiled an overall record of 6–3 with a mark of 2–2 in SIAA play. C. M. Robbs was the team captain. The team was a member of the Southern Intercollegiate Athletic Association.

Schedule

References

Bibliography
 

Clemson
Clemson Tigers football seasons
Clemson Tigers football